Marcel Dan Țenter (born July 26, 1969) is a Romanian basketball coach, currently for U Cluj, and a former professional basketball player.

Basketball career

Coach
Țenter began his coaching career as Assistant Coach in CS U-Cluj-Napoca near The American coach, Tab Baldwin. He won the Romanian championship as Head Coach with the team in 2010/11 season.

On June 7, 2012, Țenter signed with a team of Gaz Metan Mediaș for two years, the team playing in the Romanian Basketball League and the EuroChallenge. He won Romanian Cup in season 2012–2013. Since 2013 he is head coach also at the national man team of Romania.. On 29 May he signed for Alba Fehérvár with 1+1 year deal.

External links
Marcel Țenter a semnat cu Gaz Metan Mediaș (ro)
Marcel Tenter the new Head Coach of Gaz Metan Medias (en)
http://www.fibaeurope.com/cid_KNce8jInH7Qj1EsyH5rjn2.teamID_351.compID_qMRZdYCZI6EoANOrUf9le2.season_2015.roundID_9486.d_s.coachID_1012.html

References

1969 births
Living people
Brose Bamberg players
CS Universitatea Cluj-Napoca (men's basketball) players
Romanian expatriate basketball people in Germany
Israeli Basketball Premier League players
Kaposvári KK players
Maccabi Ashdod B.C. players
Point guards
Romanian basketball coaches
Romanian expatriate sportspeople in Germany
Romanian expatriate basketball people in Hungary
Romanian expatriate basketball people in Israel
Romanian men's basketball players
Sportspeople from Cluj-Napoca
Szolnoki Olaj KK players